Bandit is a 2022 Canadian biographical crime film directed by Allan Ungar and starring Josh Duhamel, Elisha Cuthbert, Nestor Carbonell and Mel Gibson. The film is based on the true life story of Gilbert Galvan Jr (also known as The Flying Bandit), who still holds a record for the most consecutive robberies in Canadian history. The screenplay by Kraig Wenman is largely based on interviews and accounts featured in the 1996 true crime book The Flying Bandit by Robert Knuckle with Ed Arnold.

Redbox Entertainment and Quiver Distribution acquired North American distribution rights to the film and released it in theatres and on demand on September 23, 2022. The film received mostly positive reviews with critics calling it a career-best performance by Duhamel.

Plot
Gilbert Galvan Jr, a charming career criminal, escapes from a Michigan prison and crosses the border into Ontario, Canada where he assumes a new identity as Robert Whiteman. After falling in love with a woman he cannot provide for, he turns to robbing banks and discovers that he is exceptionally good at it. Under the guise of a security analyst, Robert begins flying around the country robbing multiple cities in a day, eventually catching the attention of national news outlets that dub him The Flying Bandit. With his notoriety growing in record time, he is put into the direct sights of a ruthless detective who will stop at nothing to bring him down.

Cast
Josh Duhamel as Gilbert Galvan Jr/Robert Whiteman
Mel Gibson as Tommy Kay
Elisha Cuthbert as Andrea Hudson
Nestor Carbonell as John Snydes

Production

Casting
On October 30, 2020, it was announced that Josh Duhamel would star as Gilbert Galvan Jr in an adaptation of Robert Knuckle's book The Flying Bandit, which details the life of Galvan.  On May 19, 2021, Mel Gibson and Elisha Cuthbert joined the cast. On June 15, 2021, it was reported that Nestor Carbonell had joined the cast as a detective hunting Duhamel's character.

Filming
Filming was originally planned to take place in Vancouver and Ottawa, but due to the Covid-19 pandemic, most of the production was relocated to the state of Georgia. Film crews were spotted in and around the Valdosta area in May and June 2021. Additional filming took place in Ottawa in September 2021.

During interviews with Collider and Screen Rant, director Allan Ungar revealed that even though the shooting schedule was cut from 32 days down to 21, the production still managed to shoot 200 scenes across 95 sets and locations. This often required Ungar to be directing three units at once, sometimes with cast member Nestor Carbonell's help. Carbonell tore his achilles tendon while filming the chase scene for The Big Vancouver. Although he was advised to go in for surgery immediately, he decided to stay on until the completion of principal photography with the assistance of a walking boot. Despite this, only a few of the scenes involving his character Snydes had to be rewritten.

Release
The film was released in theatres in the US and Canada on September 23, 2022, and was also made available on digital platforms. In its first two weeks of release, Bandit was the #1  movie on iTunes across multiple categories and was the 5th most watched film on the platform. Upon its debut on Paramount Plus Canada, it was the #1 film in its first week. It was released in the UK and several countries in Europe as an Amazon Original on Prime Video on February 22, 2023 where it spent its first two weeks at #1 and #2, and remained in the top 10 of all films for its first month. The film also reached #1 on Apple TV in Canada, Australia, Spain and Russia. 

On October 28, 2022, one month after its release, Redbox announced that the film was the most watched original title of 2022 and their 2nd-best release ever.

Reception

Critical response 
Critical reception for the film has been mostly positive with many critics and journalists praising Josh Duhamel for delivering a career best performance as well as Ungar's direction. On Rotten Tomatoes, 74% of 31 critics gave the film a positive review, with the critic consensus declaring "It struggles to consistently capture its fact-based story's stranger-than-fiction charm, but Bandit mostly works -- and Josh Duhamel has never been better."

Chris Bumbray from Joblo called Duhamel's performance "terrific" in a "solid crime caper" and Julian Roman from Movieweb said "Josh Duhamel gives his career-best performance as a wily and infectiously charming bank robber." Chris Knight from The National Post rated the film four out of five stars and said "Toronto director Allan Ungar keeps the pace fast and light; despite a two-hour running time, the film never lags." 

Brian Costello from Common Sense Media also rated the film four out of five stars and said "Bandit is over two hours long, but the balance between the action and the story is so solid, it's easy to get lost in what's happening."

Vincent Mancini from Uproxx was more mixed in his review, but expressed that "Duhamel has never been better.". Screen Rant's Brittany Witherspoon was also mixed in her review, giving the film a 2.5/4 but said "the chemistry between Josh Duhamel and Elisha Cuthbert is exceptional."

Elizabeth Weitzman from The Wrap said "Josh Duhamel steals the show" and that "it may occur to you while watching that the star would have made a great, old-school Bond." Film critic Richard Crouse gave the film three out of four stars, calling it a "Slick, although not very deep, crime story buoyed by enjoyable performances." 

Digital Journal called Duhamel's performance "superb" and the film "riveting." Markos Papadatos noted that "Duhamel delivers a raw, unflinching, and commanding performance as Gilbert, and he steals every scene he is in. His delivery is controlled and subtle, and he captures the conscience of the clever bank robber."

References

External links
 

Films shot in Georgia (U.S. state)
Canadian crime drama films
Films directed by Allan Ungar
2020s Canadian films